Edward Hobson may refer to:

 Edward H. Hobson (1825–1901), American merchant, banker, politician and brigadier general
 Edward Hobson (botanist) (1782–1830), English weaver and botanist
 Edward Hobson (cricketer) (1869–1923), English cricketer